Nhơn Trạch is a rural district of Đồng Nai province in the Southeast region of Vietnam. As of 2003 the district had a population of 116,169. The district covers an area of 431 km². The district capital is at Phú Hội.

References

Districts of Đồng Nai province